Lê Dũng Tráng, (born 1947 in Saigon) is a Vietnamese-French mathematician.

Life and work  
In the 1950s, Lê Dũng Tráng came to France, where he attended the Lycée Louis-le-Grand in Paris. He obtained a Ph.D. degree at the University of Paris in 1969 and 1971 under the supervision of Claude Chevalley and Pierre Deligne. From 1975 to 1999, he was professor at the University of Paris VII and research director of the CNRS. From 1983 to 1995 he was also a professor at the École Polytechnique. From 2002 to 2009 he headed the department of mathematics at the International Centre for Theoretical Physics (ICTP), in Trieste, Italy.

He was a frequent guest scientist at Harvard University (with Phillip Griffiths) and Northeastern University (with Terence Gaffney and David B. Massey).

He is particularly concerned with singularity theory in the complex domain (Milnor fibrations, perverse sheaves).

In 2000 he was involved in promoting scientific exchange between the United States and Vietnam. For this, he received an honorary doctorate from the Vietnam Academy of Science and Technology in 2004. He is a Fellow of the Third World Academy of Sciences.

His students include Hélène Esnault and Claude Sabbah.

Selected publications 
 Introduction à la théorie des singularités, Paris, Hermann, 2 volumes, 1988.
 Publisher: Algebraic approach to differential equations, Bibliotheca Alexandrina, Alexandria, Nov. 2007, World Scientific 2010.
 Editor with Kyoji Saito and Bernard Teissier: Singularity Theory, World Scientific 1995.
Topology of hypersurfaces complexes, in singularités à Cargese, astérisque 7/8, 1973, 171–182.
 with C. P. Ramanujam, The invariance of Milnor's number implies the invariance of the topological type, American Journal of Mathematics 98 (1976), 67–78
Calcul du nombre de cycles évanouissants d'une hyper surface complexe, Annales de l'Institut Fourier 23 (1973), 261–270, NUMDAM.
Topological Use of Polar Curves, Proc. Symp Pure Math, Volume 29, 1975, pp 507–512.
 with Francoise Michel and Claude Weber, Courbes polaires et topologie des courbes planes, Annales Scientifiques de l'École Normale Supérieure, Sér.4, band 24, 1991, pp. 141–169, NUMDAM
 The geometry of the monodromy theorem in C. P. Ramanujam – a tribute, Tata Institute, Springer Verlag 1978, 157–173
 with Helmut Hamm, Un théoreme de Zariski du type de Lefschetz, Annales Scientifiques de l'École Normale Supérieure 6 (1973), 317–366.

Literature 
 Jean-Paul Brasselet, José Luis Cisneros-Molina, David Massey, José Seade, Bernard Teissier (Editor) Singularities : international conference in honor of the 60th birthday of Lê Dũng Tráng, Cuernavaca/Mexico 2007, 2 volumes, Contemporary Mathematics, American Mathematical Society 2008.

References

External links 
 Portrait at Northeastern University
 David Massey, Lê's work on hypersurface singularities

French people of Vietnamese descent
20th-century Vietnamese mathematicians
Topologists
20th-century French mathematicians
21st-century French mathematicians
Lycée Louis-le-Grand alumni
University of Paris alumni
Academic staff of Paris Diderot University
Research directors of the French National Centre for Scientific Research